The canton of Digne-les-Bains-2 is an administrative division of the Alpes-de-Haute-Provence department, in southeastern France. It was created at the French canton reorganisation which came into effect in March 2015. Its seat is in Digne-les-Bains.

It consists of the following communes:

Aiglun
Barras
Champtercier
Digne-les-Bains (partly)
Malijai
Mallemoisson
Mirabeau

References

Cantons of Alpes-de-Haute-Provence